Out of Bounds is a comic strip by Don Wilder (1934–2008) and Bill Rechin (1930–2011). It was first syndicated on June 2, 1986, and ran until 1998.  Rechin received the National Cartoonist Society Newspaper Panel Cartoon Award for 1992 for his work on the strip.

References

External links
NCS Awards

American comic strips
1986 comics debuts
Gag-a-day comics
Sports comics